James O'Beirne may refer to:
 James O'Beirne (politician)
 James O'Beirne (surgeon)